Year 1492 (MCDXCII) was a leap year starting on Sunday (link will display the full calendar) of the Julian calendar.

1492 is considered to be a significant year in the history of the West, Europe, Christianity, Islam, Judaism, Spain, and the New World, among others, because of the number of significant events that took place.

The events which propelled the year into Western consciousness, listed below, include the completion of the Reconquista of Spain, Europe's (Spain) discovery of the New World, and the expulsion of Jews from Spain.

Events 

 Known dates 
 January 2 – Fall of Granada: Muhammad XII, the last Emir of Granada, surrenders his city to the army of the Catholic Monarchs (Ferdinand II of Aragon and Isabella I of Castile) after a lengthy siege, ending the ten-year Granada War and the centuries-long Reconquista, and bringing an end to 780 years of Muslim control in Al-Andalus.
 January 6 – Ferdinand and Isabella enter Granada.
 January 15 – Christopher Columbus meets Ferdinand and Isabella at the Alcázar de los Reyes Cristianos in Córdoba, Andalusia, and persuades them to support his Atlantic voyage intended to find a new route to the East Indies.
 January 16 – Antonio de Nebrija publishes Gramática de la lengua castellana, the first grammar text for the Castilian Spanish language, in Salamanca, which he introduces to the Catholic Monarchs, Isabella I of Castile and Ferdinand II of Aragon, newly restored to power in Andalusia, as "a tool of empire".
 January 23 – The Pentateuch is first printed.
 March 31 – Ferdinand and Isabella sign the Alhambra Decree, expelling all Jews from Spain unless they convert to Roman Catholicism.
 April 17 – The Capitulations of Santa Fe are signed between Christopher Columbus and the Crown of Castile, agreeing on arrangements for his forthcoming voyage.
 June 7 – Casimir IV Jagiellon, of the Jagiellon Royal House, dies, ending his reign over Poland and Lithuania.
 June 8 – Elizabeth Woodville, the last living Yorkist queen, dies in England.
 July 31 – The Jews are expelled from Spain; 40,000–200,000 leave. Sultan Bayezid II of the Ottoman Empire, learning of this, dispatches the Ottoman Navy to bring the Jews safely to Ottoman lands, mainly  to the cities of Thessaloniki (in modern-day Greece) and İzmir (in modern-day Turkey).
 August 3 – The Genoese navigator Christopher Columbus sails with three ships from Palos de la Frontera, in the service of the Crown of Castile, on his first voyage across the Atlantic Ocean, intending to reach Asia.
 August 11 – Pope Alexander VI succeeds Pope Innocent VIII as the 214th pope, after the 1492 papal conclave, the first held in the Sistine Chapel.
 September 6 – Christopher Columbus sails from La Gomera in the Canary Islands, his final port of call before crossing the Atlantic Ocean for the first time.
 October 3 – English army besieges Boulogne.
 October 12 – Christopher Columbus' expedition makes landfall in the Caribbean and lands on Guanahani, but he believes he has reached the East Indies.
 October 28 – Christopher Columbus lands in Cuba.
 November 3 – The Peace of Étaples is signed between England and France, ending French support for Perkin Warbeck, the pretender to the English throne. All English-held territory in France (with the exception of Calais) is returned to France.
 November 7 – The Ensisheim meteorite, a  meteorite, lands in a wheat field near the village of Ensisheim in Alsace.
 December 5 – Christopher Columbus becomes the first European to set foot on the island of Hispaniola.
 December 25 – Columbus' ship Santa María runs aground off Cap-Haïtien, and is lost.

 Unknown dates
 Martin Behaim constructs the first surviving globe of Earth, the Erdapfel. As Columbus would only return from his voyage in 1493, this globe does not show the New World yet.
 The first arboretum to be designed and planted is the Arboretum Trsteno, near Dubrovnik in Croatia.
 Russians build the Ivangorod Fortress, on the eastern banks of the Narva River.
 In Ming dynasty China, the commercial transportation of grain to the northern border, in exchange for salt certificates, is monetized.
 Ermysted's Grammar School, Skipton, North Yorkshire, is founded.
 Marsilio Ficino publishes his translation and commentary of Plotinus.
 Stiegl brewery first recorded in Salzburg.

Births 

 January 22 – Beatrix of Baden, Margravine of Baden, Countess Palatine consort of Simmern (d. 1535)
 March 4 – Francesco de Layolle, Italian composer (d. c. 1540)
 March 21 – John II, Count Palatine of Simmern, Count Palatine of Simmern (1509-1557) (d. 1557)
 March 27 – Adam Ries, German mathematician (d. 1559)
 April 4 – Ambrosius Blarer, influential reformer in southern Germany and north-eastern Switzerland (d. 1564)
 April 6 – Maud Green, English noble (d. 1531)
 April 11 – Marguerite de Navarre, queen of Henry II of Navarre (d. 1549)
 April 20 – Pietro Aretino, Italian author (d. 1556)
 April 24 – Duchess Sabina of Bavaria (d. 1564)
 May 8 – Andrea Alciato, Italian jurist and writer (d. 1550)
 August 1 – Wolfgang, Prince of Anhalt-Köthen, German prince (d. 1566)
 August 8 – Matteo Tafuri, Italian alchemist (d. 1582)
 September 12 – Lorenzo de' Medici, Duke of Urbino (d. 1519)
 September 29 – Chamaraja Wodeyar III, King of Mysore (d. 1553)
 October 1 – Georg Rörer, German theologian (d. 1557)
 October 11 – Charles Orlando, Dauphin of France, French noble (d. 1495)
 October 30 – Anne d'Alençon, French noblewoman (d. 1562)
 November 12 – Johan Rantzau, German general (d. 1565)
 November 27 – Donato Giannotti, Italian writer (d. 1573)
 date unknown
 Argula von Grumbach, German Protestant reformer (d. 1554) 
 Berchtold Haller, Swiss reformer (d. 1536)
 Amago Kunihisa, Japanese nobleman (d. 1554)
 Giacomo Aconcio, Italian pioneer of religious tolerance (d. 1566)
 Hirate Masahide, Japanese retainer and tutor of Oda Nobunaga (d. 1553)
 Edward Wotton, English physician and zoologist (d. 1555)
 probable
 Thomas Manners, 1st Earl of Rutland (d. 1543)
 Fernan Perez de Oliva, Spanish man of letters (d. 1531)
 Polidoro da Caravaggio, Italian painter (d. 1543)
 Bernal Díaz del Castillo, Spanish historian (d. 1584)

Deaths 

 January 25 – Ygo Gales Galama, Frisian warlord and freedom-fighting rebel (murdered) (b. 1443)
 April 8 – Lorenzo de' Medici, ruler of Florence (b. 1449)
 March 19 – Philip II, Count of Nassau-Weilburg (1429–1492) (b. 1418)
 c. May 21 – John de la Pole, 2nd Duke of Suffolk (b. 1442)
 June 7  – Casimir IV Jagiellon, King of Poland (b. 1427)
 June 8 – Elizabeth Woodville, Queen of Edward IV of England (b. 1437)
 July 1 – Henry the Younger of Poděbrady, Bohemian nobleman (b. 1452)
 July 25 – Pope Innocent VIII (b. 1432)
 August 9 – Beatrice of Silva, Spanish Dominican and Roman Catholic nun and a saint
 September 20 – Anne Neville, Countess of Warwick (b. 1426)
 September 23 – Peter Courtenay, English bishop and politician
 October 12 – Piero della Francesca, Italian artist (b. c. 1412)
 October 25 – Thaddeus McCarthy, Irish bishop (b. c. 1455)
 November 6 – Antoine Busnois, French composer and poet (b. c. 1430)
 November 9 – Jami, Persian poet (b. 1414)
 November 24 – Loys of Gruuthuse, Earl of Winchester (b. c. 1427)

Exact date unknown
 Ali al-Jabarti,  Somali scholar and politician
 Baccio Pontelli, Italian architect (b. c. 1450)
 Dhammazedi, Burmese king of Hanthawaddy (b. 1409)
 Eric Clauesson, Swedish Norse pagan
 Satal Rathore, Rao of Marwar
 Sonni Ali, Songhai ruler

References

External links